Coors Amphitheatre may refer to the following amphitheatres:
 Coors Amphitheatre (San Diego), later Sleep Train Amphitheatre
 Coors Amphitheatre (Greenwood Village, Colorado), later Comfort Dental Amphitheatre and Fiddler's Green Amphitheatre

See also 
 Coors Light Amphitheatre